There is no current State Route 31 in the U.S. state of Alabama.

See U.S. Route 31 in Alabama for the current route numbered 31
See Alabama State Route 31 (pre-1957) for the former SR 31